Garel is a surname. Notable people with the surname include:

Adrien Garel  (born 1996), French cyclist
Cyriack Garel (born 1996), French footballer
Gia'na Garel, American radio personality
Georges Garel (1909-1979), member of the French Resistance in World War II
Hervé Garel (born 1967), French cyclist
Jean Garel (1852–1931), French physician
Leo Garel (1917–1999), American artist
Lili Garel (1921-2013), French Jewish resistance fighter
Saskia Garel (born 1969), Canadian actress
Sylvain Garel (born 1956), French politician

See also
Tristan Garel-Jones (born 1941), British politician